George Samaras, better known as Plastic Flowers, is a Greek songwriter and academic at King's College London, who has released three full-length studio albums: Evergreen in 2014, Heavenly in 2016 and Absent Forever in 2017.

Career 
George started recording music on a TASCAM Multi-track and released a series of bedroom pop influenced EPs that have received praise for their lo-fi touch.

In 2014 his debut album Evergreen was released through Inner Ear Records, and Crash Symbols in Europe and the United States respectively. He later moved to London and recorded his second full-length album Heavenly in November 2015, and Absent Forever in 2017, both released via The Native Sound and distributed by Warner.

He became the first Greek act ever to perform at South by Southwest. He has also toured USA and Europe and performed live at the Royal Academy of Arts, Fun Fun Fun Fest, Stavros Niarchos Foundation Cultural Center, Athens Concert Hall and Thessaloniki Concert Hall, and shared the stage with Bonobo, A.R.Kane, Emancipator, Still Corners.

On his debut album Evergreen he collaborated with Keep Shelly in Athens and NY-based artist and painter Ed Askew, who also painted the album cover for Heavenly.

Theodoros Pangalos Sample 
In 2012, Plastic Flowers sampled Theodoros Pangalos' controversial ministerial statement "We [government and citizens] fooled away the money together" in Sinking Ship/Vanished Crew.

Academia 
As an undergraduate studying German at Aristotle University of Thessaloniki between 2009 and 2014, Samaras read modern and contemporary literature. He later completed a master's degree in Education Policy, and a PhD at King's College London, where he investigated the rise of Golden Dawn in Greece during the fiscal crisis. He regularly contributes to Greek newspapers Kathimerini and Efimerida ton Syntakton. Since 2022, he works as Lecturer at King's College London.

In June 2020, during the Black Lives Matter protests, he started a campaign against a local school in West Hampstead, named after slaver William Beckford. The campaign received coverage from national and local media, and support from British actress Emma Thompson resulting in a name change.

Discography

LPs 
Evergreen (2014, Inner Ear Records – Crash Symbols)
Heavenly (2016, The Native Sound – Track & Field Records)
Absent Forever (2017, The Native Sound – Distributed by Warner-ADA)

EPs and singles 
Meltdown EP (2011, Cakes and Tapes)
White Walls Painted Black – Single (2011, Cakes and Tapes)
Natural Conspiracy EP (2012, Cakes and Tapes)
Empty Eyes – Single (2012, Bad Panda Records)
In You I'm Lost – Single (2012, self-released)
Aftermath EP (2013, Manic Pop Records)
Fog Song/Silence – Double 7" (2013, Manic Pop Records)
Now She's Gone – Single (2014, self-released)
Summer of 1992 EP (2015, self-released)
Falling Off – Single 7" (2016, The Native Sound)
Plastic Flowers - Live at Megaron Mousikis (2023, self-released)

References

External links 
Plastic Flowers official website
Plastic Flowers on Facebook
Plastic Flowers on Soundcloud

1991 births
Greek musicians
Greek expatriates in the United Kingdom

Living people
Musicians from Thessaloniki